The Katz Drug Store sit-in was one of the first sit-ins during the civil rights movement, occurring on August 19, 1958, in Oklahoma City, Oklahoma. In protest of racial discrimination, black schoolchildren sat at a lunch counter with their teacher demanding food, refusing to leave until they were served. They sought to end the racial segregation of eating places in their city, sparking a sit-in movement in Oklahoma City that lasted for years.

Event 
In 1958, even though separate but equal had been overturned, racial discrimination was still commonplace and restricted blacks from sharing many public spaces with whites. Black people had to drink from colored fountains, ride the back of buses, and were given their dinners in bags to eat outside of the restaurant. Clara Luper, a black high school teacher in Oklahoma City, was a civil rights activist and the advisor for the Youth Council of the Oklahoma City NAACP. Luper took a trip with her students to New York City to put on the play "Brother President,"  where they witnessed Black people living in a desegregated environment. They experienced integrated restaurants and other freedoms that Black people in Oklahoma City had not been accustomed to. After their return to Oklahoma, Luper’s daughter Marilyn asked, "Why didn't I just go in and ask for a Coca-Cola and a hamburger?" in reference to the Katz Drug Store. This prompted Luper to stage a sit-in with thirteen of her Black students. Along with Clara Luper, the participants of the sit-in were Marilyn Luper, Calvin Luper, Portwood Williams, Jr., Donda West, Richard Brown, Barbara Posey, Alma Faye Washington, Areda Tollivar Spinks, Elmer Edwards, Lynzetta Jones Carter, Gwendolyn Fuller Mukes, Lana Pogue, Linda Pogue, and Betty Germany. Before the event, Luper gathered the students to teach them about the principles of civil disobedience and to train them on how to react to opposition. After their preparation, the first day of the sit-in began on August 19, 1958, when Clara Luper and the children sat down at the counter of the Katz Drug Store and ordered thirteen cokes. They were refused service, but they stayed at the counter for hours while whites kicked them, punched them, spat at them, and poured things on them. They returned for two more days; on the third day of their protest, one of the employees served them their food, ending segregation in the restaurant.

Results 
The sit-in at the Katz Drug Store sparked a series of sit-ins throughout Downtown Oklahoma City's restaurants. Similar protests occurred throughout the city until 1964, when Oklahoma City passed an ordinance forbidding restaurants from refusing service or facilities to anyone based on race, religion, color, sex, or national origin. Similar sit-in movements were held across the country, most notably the Greensboro sit-ins and Nashville sit-ins in 1960, which gained national attention. One month after Oklahoma City's ordinance was put into place, the Civil Rights Act of 1964 was passed, which illegalized discrimination across the country.

References 

African-American history in Oklahoma City
Civil rights movement
1958 protests
1958 in Oklahoma
Civil rights protests in the United States
August 1958 events in the United States